This is a list of shipwrecks located in the Pacific Ocean.

North Pacific

Bering Sea

East China Sea

Gulf of Alaska

Philippine Sea

Sea of Okhotsk

South China Sea

Yellow Sea

South Pacific

Bismarck Sea

Chilean Sea

Coral Sea

Solomon Sea

Tasman Sea

External links

 Map of New Zealand wrecks to 1936
 20th century New Zealand wrecks

Pacific Ocean
Pacific Ocean